The 1799 Pennsylvania gubernatorial election was between two candidates. Incumbent governor Thomas Mifflin was not running. The race was between Federalist U.S. Senator James Ross and Democratic-Republican Thomas McKean. The retired Chief Justice of the Pennsylvania Supreme Court, McKean was a Federalist and a Mifflin ally, as both supported strong state executive power but rejected the domestic policies of the national government.

Some historians have pointed to McKean's victory as a forecast of Thomas Jefferson's election in the 1800 United States presidential election the next year.

Results

References

http://www.ourcampaigns.com/RaceDetail.html?RaceID=42582

Pennsylvania
1799
Gubernatorial